In mathematics, the Dixon elliptic functions sm and cm are two elliptic functions (doubly periodic meromorphic functions on the complex plane) that map from each regular hexagon in a hexagonal tiling to the whole complex plane. Because these functions satisfy the identity , as real functions they parametrize the cubic Fermat curve , just as the trigonometric functions sine and cosine parametrize the unit circle .

They were named sm and cm by Alfred Dixon in 1890, by analogy to the trigonometric functions sine and cosine and the Jacobi elliptic functions sn and cn; Göran Dillner described them earlier in 1873.

Definition 

The functions sm and cm can be defined as the solutions to the initial value problem:

Or as the inverse of the Schwarz–Christoffel mapping from the complex unit disk to an equilateral triangle, the Abelian integral:

which can also be expressed using the hypergeometric function:

Parametrization of the cubic Fermat curve 

They satisfy the identity . To see why, apply Green's theorem:

 

Symmetries 

The  function  has zeros at the complex-valued points . Both functions have poles at the complex-valued points .

Fundamental reflections, rotations, and translations 

Both  and  commute with complex conjugation,

 

Analogous to the parity of trigonometric functions (cosine an even function and sine an odd function), the Dixon function  is invariant under  turn rotations of the complex plane, and  turn rotations of the domain of  cause  turn rotations of the codomain:

Each Dixon elliptic function is invariant under translations by the Eisenstein integers  scaled by 

 

For  translations by  give

Specific values

More specific values

Sum and difference identities 
The Dixon elliptic functions satisfy the argument sum and difference identities:

These formulas can be used to compute the complex-valued functions in real components:

Multiple-argument identities 

Argument duplication and triplication identities can be derived from the sum identity:

Because by finding , quartic or lesser degree in some cases equation has to be solved as seen from duplication formula which means that if , then . To find one-third of argument value of cm, equation which is reductible to cubic or lesser degree in some cases by variable exchange  has to be solved as seen from triplication formula from that follows: if  then  is true. Statement    is true, because any multiple argument formula is a rational function. If , then  because  where .

Specific value identities 

Power series 

whose coefficients satisfy the recurrence 

These recurrences result in:

Relation to other elliptic functions

Weierstrass elliptic function 

The equianharmonic Weierstrass elliptic function  with lattice  a scaling of the Eisenstein integers, can be defined as:

The function  solves the differential equation:

We can also write it as the inverse of the integral:

 

Likewise, the Weierstrass elliptic function  can be written in terms of Dixon elliptic functions:

Jacobi elliptic functions 

The Dixon elliptic functions can also be expressed using Jacobi elliptic functions, which was first observed by Cayley. Then, let 

 , .

Finally, the Dixon elliptic functions are as so:

 , .

Generalized trigonometry 

Several definitions of generalized trigonometric functions include the usual trigonometric sine and cosine as an  case, and the functions sm and cm as an  case.

For example, defining  and  the inverses of an integral:

The area in the positive quadrant under the curve  is

.

The quartic  case results in a square lattice in the complex plane, related to the lemniscate elliptic functions.

Applications 

The Dixon elliptic functions are conformal maps from an equilateral triangle to a disk, and are therefore helpful for constructing polyhedral conformal map projections involving equilateral triangles, for example projecting the sphere onto a triangle, hexagon, tetrahedron, octahedron, or icosahedron.

See also 
 Eisenstein integer
 Elliptic function
 Abel elliptic functions
 Jacobi elliptic functions
 Lemniscate elliptic functions
 Weierstrass elliptic function
 Lee conformal world in a tetrahedron
 Schwarz–Christoffel mapping

External links 

 Desmos plots:
 Real-valued Dixon elliptic functions https://www.desmos.com/calculator/5s4gdcnxh2.
 Parametrizing the cubic Fermat curve, https://www.desmos.com/calculator/elqqf4nwas
 On-Line Encyclopedia of Integer Sequences pages:
 “Coefficient of x^(3n+1)/(3n+1)! in the Maclaurin expansion of the Dixon elliptic function sm(x,0).” https://oeis.org/A104133
 “Coefficient of x^(3n)/(3n)! in the Maclaurin expansion of the Dixon elliptic function cm(x,0).” https://oeis.org/A104134
 “Pi(3): fundamental real period of the Dixonian elliptic functions sm(z) and cm(z).” https://oeis.org/A197374
 Mathematics Stack Exchange discussions:
 “On , the Dixonian elliptic functions, and the Borwein cubic theta functions”, https://math.stackexchange.com/questions/2090523/
 “doubly periodic functions as tessellations (other than parallelograms)”, https://math.stackexchange.com/questions/35671/

Notes

References 

 O. S. Adams (1925). Elliptic functions applied to conformal world maps (No. 297). US Government Printing Office. ftp://ftp.library.noaa.gov/docs.lib/htdocs/rescue/cgs_specpubs/QB275U35no1121925.pdf
 R. Bacher & P. Flajolet (2010) “Pseudo-factorials, elliptic functions, and continued fractions” The Ramanujan journal 21(1), 71–97. https://arxiv.org/pdf/0901.1379.pdf
Messenger of Mathematics 11, 142–143. https://gdz.sub.uni-goettingen.de/id/PPN599484047_0011?tify={%22pages%22:%5b146%5d}
 F. D. Burgoyne (1964) “Generalized trigonometric functions”. Mathematics of Computation 18(86), 314–316. https://www.jstor.org/stable/2003310
 A. Cayley (1883) “On the elliptic function solution of the equation ”, Proceedings of the Cambridge Philosophical Society 4, 106–109. https://archive.org/details/proceedingsofcam4188083camb/page/106/
 R. Chapling (2016) “Invariant Meromorphic Functions on the Wallpaper Groups”. https://arxiv.org/pdf/1608.05677
 J. F. Cox (1935) “Répresentation de la surface entière de la terre dans une triangle équilatéral”, Bulletin de la Classe des Sciences, Académie Royale de Belgique 5e, 21, 66–71.
 G. Dillner (1873) “Traité de calcul géométrique supérieur”, Chapter 16, Nova acta Regiae Societatis Scientiarum Upsaliensis, Ser. III 8, 94–102. https://archive.org/details/novaactaregiaeso38kung/page/94/
 
 A. Dixon (1894) The elementary properties of the elliptic functions. MacMillian. https://archive.org/details/elempropellipt00dixorich/
 
 A. Gambini, G. Nicoletti, & D. Ritelli (2021) “Keplerian trigonometry”. Monatshefte für Mathematik 195(1), 55–72. https://doi.org/10.1007/s00605-021-01512-0
 R. Grammel (1948) “Eine Verallgemeinerung der Kreis-und Hyperbelfunktionen”. Archiv der Mathematik 1(1), 47–51. https://doi.org/10.1007/BF02038206
 J. C. Langer & D. A. Singer (2014) “The Trefoil”. Milan Journal of Mathematics 82(1), 161-182. https://case.edu/artsci/math/langer/jlpreprints/Trefoil.pdf
 M. Laurent (1949) “Tables de la fonction elliptique de Dixon pour l’intervalle 0-0, 1030”. Bulletin de l’Académie Royale des Sciences de Belgique Classe des Sciences, 35, 439–450.
 L. P. Lee (1973) “The Conformal Tetrahedric Projection with some Practical Applications”. The Cartographic Journal, 10(1), 22-28. https://doi.org/10.1179/caj.1973.10.1.22
 L. P. Lee (1976) Conformal Projections Based on Elliptic Functions. University of Toronto Press. Cartographica Monograph No. 16.
 E. Lundberg (1879) “Om hypergoniometriska funktioner af komplexa variabla”. Manuscript, 1879. Translation by Jaak Peetre “On hypergoniometric functions of complex variables”. https://web.archive.org/web/20161024183030/http://www.maths.lth.se/matematiklu/personal/jaak/hypergf.ps
 J. Magis (1938) “Calcul du canevas de la représentation conforme de la sphère entière dans un triangle équilatéral”. Bulletin Géodésique 59(1), 247–256. http://doi.org/10.1007/BF03029866
 M. D. McIlroy (2011) “Wallpaper maps”. Dependable and Historic Computing. Springer. 358–375. https://link.springer.com/chapter/10.1007/978-3-642-24541-1_27
 W. P. Reinhardt & P. L. Walker (2010) “Weierstrass Elliptic and Modular Functions”, NIST Digital Library of Mathematical Functions, §23.5(v). https://dlmf.nist.gov/23.5#v
 P. L. Robinson (2019) “The Dixonian elliptic functions”. https://arxiv.org/abs/1901.04296
 H. A. Schwarz (1869) “Ueber einige Abbildungsaufgaben”. Crelles Journal 1869(70), 105–120. http://doi.org/10.1515/crll.1869.70.105
 B. R. Seth & F. P. White (1934) “Torsion of beams whose cross-section is a regular polygon of n sides”. Mathematical Proceedings of the Cambridge Philosophical Society, 30(2), 139. http://doi.org/10.1017/s0305004100016558 
 D. Shelupsky (1959) “A generalization of the trigonometric functions”. The American Mathematical Monthly 66(10), 879–884. https://www.jstor.org/stable/2309789

Complex analysis